This is a chronology of ancient Greek mathematicians.

See also

References

Ancient Greek mathematicians
Greek mathematics
History of geometry
History of mathematics
Mathematics timelines